The Central Cyberspace Affairs Commission is a policy formulation and implementation body set up under the Central Committee of the Chinese Communist Party for the purpose of managing internet-related issues. This is believed to include the expansion of online services, internet security concerns, as well as broad jurisdiction over policies on internet censorship. The Central Cyberspace Affairs Commission runs the Public Opinion Information Center, which coordinates with state media outlets on censorship. The commission's executive arm is the Office of the Central Cyberspace Affairs Commission, which has the external name of the Cyberspace Administration of China under the "one institution with two names" system.

History 
The commission was originally established as the Central Leading Group for Cybersecurity and Informatization, also called the Cyberspace Affairs Leading Group. The decision to establish the group was announced at the 3rd Plenary Session of the 18th Central Committee in November 2013, but did not hold its first full meeting until February 2014. The Leading Group was not a wholly new created entity, since it was primarily a reconstitution of the Leading Group for National Informatization, with a similar membership composition.

In March 2018, the leading group was transformed into a commission, called the Central Cybersecurity and Informatization Commission, also called the Central Cyberspace Affairs Commission (CCAC).

Membership

Director
Xi Jinping (Politburo Standing Committee Member, Party General Secretary, State President)
Deputy Directors
Li Keqiang (Politburo Standing Committee, Premier of the State Council)
Chief of General Office
Zhuang Rongwen, concurrently Director of the Cyberspace Administration of China, deputy head of the Propaganda Department, deputy director of the State Council Information Office (SCIO)

References

Institutions of the Central Committee of the Chinese Communist Party
2013 establishments in China
Organizations established in 2013